The  is an automobile plant in Tahara, Aichi, Japan owned by Toyota Motor Corporation. The address is 3-1 Midorigahama, Tahara City, Aichi Prefecture.

History
It was opened in January 1979. It is the most computerized and robotized automotive plant in the world and produces Lexus brand vehicles, including the Lexus IS, Lexus GS, Lexus LS, Lexus GX, and Lexus LX models. Several Toyota vehicles have been assembled there as well, including the Celica, Land Cruiser, Land Cruiser Prado, RAV4/Vanguard, WISH, and 4Runner. The plant also manufactures engines. Current Toyota vehicles being produced at the Tahara plant are the following: Toyota 4Runner Employees look through 4,000 details for every car produced. The plant creates a Lexus every 87 seconds, equal to 675 Lexus models per day.

When employees enter the factory floor, they pass through an air shower to remove dust. They are required to exercise and perform other physical activities such as holding and rolling golf balls in their palms. These motor exercises keep staff sharp, and Toyota believes these behaviors are essential to help retain the standards necessary to produce flawless vehicles.

The New York Times columnist Thomas Friedman visited the plant in the early 1990s, and described the experience as an example of globalization in his best-selling 1999 book, The Lexus and the Olive Tree. In his book, Friedman detailed the precise installation of windshield rubber seals by the factory's robots, along with human quality controls.

See also
 List of Toyota manufacturing facilities#Japan

References

External links 
 Lexus Tahara  - official site (in Japanese)

Toyota factories
Motor vehicle assembly plants in Japan
Buildings and structures in Aichi Prefecture
Tahara, Aichi
Industrial buildings completed in 1979
1979 establishments in Japan